Rastriya Prajantantra Party (Samyukta) ( (संयुक्त)), literally the National Democratic Party (United) and abbreviated RPP (U), was a political party in Nepal. It was formed on 6 August 2017 by Pashupati Shamsher Jang Bahadur Rana after splitting from the Rastriya Prajatantra Party as the Rastriya Prajatantra Party (Democratic). On 31 January 2019, it merged with the Unified Rastriya Prajatantra Party (Nationalist), another splinter group of the Rastriya Prajatantra Party, to form Samyukta.

History

Formation 
The Rastriya Prajatantra Party (Democratic) was formed by Pashupati SJB Rana after disagreements with Rastriya Prajatantra Party chairman Kamal Thapa about joining the government. The party was formed with 18 members to the Legislature Parliament of Nepal from Rastriya Prajatantra Party. The party was absent for the vote on the constitution amendment bill on 22 August 2017.

The party joined the Sher Bahadur Deuba led government on 10 September 2017. Deepak Bohara, Bikram Panday and Sunil Bahadur Thapa were inducted as ministers in the cabinet. Deepak Bohara was also elected parliamentary party leader. Two more ministers were inducted in the cabinet on 17 September 2017.

Merger and dissolution 
In response the electoral alliance by the Communist Party of Nepal (Unified Marxist–Leninist) and the Communist Party of Nepal (Maoist Centre), the party joined an electoral alliance with Nepali Congress and the Rastriya Prajatantra Party. In the 2017 legislative and provincial elections, the party did not win any seat to the House of Representatives. The party did win a single seat to the Provincial Assembly of Province No. 3 however through proportional representation. The party merged into Rastriya Prajatantra Party on March 12, 2020.

Electoral performance

Presence in various provinces

Leadership

Chairmen 
 Pashupati SJB Rana, 2017–2020
 Prakash Chandra Lohani, 2019–2020

See also 
 Rastriya Prajatantra Party
 Rastriya Prajatantra Party Nepal

References 

Political parties in Nepal
2017 establishments in Nepal
2020 disestablishments in Nepal